Madhubani railway station is a railway station in Madhubani district, Bihar. Its code is MBI. It serves Madhubani city. The station consists of 3 platforms.

Major trains

 Jaynagar–Anand Vihar Garib Rath Express
 Darbhanga–Jaynagar Passenger
 Ganga Sagar Express
 PAWAN EXPRESS
 Janaki Intercity Express
 Puri–Jaynagar Express
 Jaynagar– DANAPUR Intercity Express
 Jaynagar–ROURKELA Express
 Samastipur–Jaynagar DEMU
 Kolkata–Jaynagar Weekly Express
 Samastipur–Jaynagar Passenger
 Kamla Ganga Intercity Fast Passenger
 Saryu Yamuna Express
 Shaheed Express
 Swatantra Senani Superfast Express
 JAYNAGAR-BHAGALPUR EXPRESS 
 JAYNAGAR-PATNA INTERCITY EXPRESS
 Samastipur–Jaynagar Passenger
 Jaynagar–Udhna Antyodaya Express
Howrah–Jaynagar Passenger

About the station 
It is awarded by Indian Railway for best railway station in India.
Whole station is decorated by Mithila paintings by regional painters.

References

Railway stations in Madhubani district
Samastipur railway division